Hamataliwa is a genus of lynx spiders that was first described by Eugen von Keyserling in 1887.

Species
 it contains eighty-three species, found in the Caribbean, Asia, Central America, Africa, North America, Australia, Paraguay, Brazil, Guyana, and Argentina:
H. albibarbis (Mello-Leitão, 1947) – Brazil
H. argyrescens Mello-Leitão, 1929 – Brazil
H. aurita Zhang, Zhu & Song, 2005 – China
H. banksi (Mello-Leitão, 1928) – Mexico to Costa Rica
H. barroana (Chamberlin & Ivie, 1936) – Mexico to Panama
H. bicolor (Mello-Leitão, 1929) – Brazil
H. bituberculata (Mello-Leitão, 1929) – Brazil, Guyana
H. brunnea (F. O. Pickard-Cambridge, 1902) – Mexico
H. buelowae Mello-Leitão, 1945 – Argentina
H. bufo Brady, 1970 – Panama
H. catenula Deeleman-Reinhold, 2009 – Malaysia, Indonesia (Borneo, Sunda Is.)
H. caudata Mello-Leitão, 1929 – Brazil
H. cavata (Kraus, 1955) – El Salvador
H. cheta Brady, 1970 – Guatemala
H. circularis (Kraus, 1955) – El Salvador
H. communicans (Chamberlin, 1925) – Hispaniola
H. cooki Grimshaw, 1989 – Australia (Northern Territory, Queensland)
H. cordata Zhang, Zhu & Song, 2005 – China
H. cornuta (Thorell, 1895) – Myanmar
H. crocata Brady, 1970 – Panama
H. cucullata Tang, Wang & Peng, 2012 – China
H. difficilis (O. Pickard-Cambridge, 1894) – Mexico
H. dimidiata (Soares & Camargo, 1948) – Brazil
H. dubia (Mello-Leitão, 1929) – Brazil
H. facilis (O. Pickard-Cambridge, 1894) – Mexico, Guatemala
H. flebilis (O. Pickard-Cambridge, 1894) – Mexico to Panama
H. floreni Deeleman-Reinhold, 2009 – Malaysia, Indonesia (Borneo)
H. foveata Tang & Li, 2012 – China
H. fronticornis (Lessert, 1927) – Congo
H. fronto (Thorell, 1890) – Indonesia (Sumatra)
H. globosa (F. O. Pickard-Cambridge, 1902) – Mexico to Panama
H. grisea Keyserling, 1887 (type) – USA, Mexico
H. haytiana (Chamberlin, 1925) – Hispaniola
H. helia (Chamberlin, 1929) – Southern USA, Mexico, Guyana, Thailand, Malaysia (Sarawak), Brunei, Indonesia (Sumatra)
H. hellia Dhali, Saha & Raychaudhuri, 2017 – India
H. hista Brady, 1970 – Panama
H. ignifuga Deeleman-Reinhold, 2009 – Borneo
H. incompta (Thorell, 1895) – India, Myanmar, Thailand, Malaysia, Philippines, Indonesia (Borneo)
H. kulczynskii (Lessert, 1915) – Ethiopia, East, South Africa
H. labialis (Song, 1991) – China
H. laeta (O. Pickard-Cambridge, 1894) – Mexico
H. latifrons (Thorell, 1890) – Indonesia (Sumatra)
H. maculipes (Bryant, 1923) – Antigua and Barbuda (Antigua)
H. manca Tang & Li, 2012 – China
H. marmorata Simon, 1898 – Brazil, Paraguay
H. menglunensis Tang & Li, 2012 – China
H. micropunctata (Mello-Leitão, 1929) – Brazil
H. monroei Grimshaw, 1989 – Australia (Queensland)
H. nigrescens Mello-Leitão, 1929 – Brazil
H. nigritarsa Bryant, 1948 – Hispaniola
H. nigriventris (Mello-Leitão, 1929) – Brazil
H. obtusa (Thorell, 1892) – Indonesia (Sumatra)
H. oculata Tang & Li, 2012 – China
H. ovata (Biswas, Kundu, Kundu, Saha & Raychaudhuri, 1996) – India
H. pedicula Tang & Li, 2012 – China
H. penicillata Mello-Leitão, 1948 – Guyana
H. pentagona Tang & Li, 2012 – China
H. perdita Mello-Leitão, 1929 – Brazil
H. peterjaegeri Deeleman-Reinhold, 2009 – Borneo
H. pilulifera Tang & Li, 2012 – China
H. porcata (Simon, 1898) – Brazil
H. positiva Chamberlin, 1924 – Mexico
H. pricompta Deeleman-Reinhold, 2009 – Borneo, Sumatra
H. puta (O. Pickard-Cambridge, 1894) – Mexico to Panama
H. quadrimaculata (Mello-Leitão, 1929) – Brazil
H. rana (Simon, 1898) – Caribbean
H. reticulata (Biswas, Kundu, Kundu, Saha & Raychaudhuri, 1996) – India
H. rostrifrons (Lawrence, 1928) – Namibia, South Africa
H. rufocaligata Simon, 1898 – Ethiopia, Somalia
H. sanmenensis Song & Zheng, 1992 – China
H. schmidti Reimoser, 1939 – Mexico to Costa Rica
H. strandi (Lessert, 1923) – South Africa
H. subfacilis (O. Pickard-Cambridge, 1894) – Mexico
H. subhadrae (Tikader, 1970) – China, India
H. submanca Tang & Li, 2012 – China
H. torsiva Tang, Wang & Peng, 2012 – China
H. triangularis (Kraus, 1955) – El Salvador, Panama
H. tricuspidata (F. O. Pickard-Cambridge, 1902) – Costa Rica to Guyana
H. truncata (Thorell, 1897) – Vietnam
H. tuberculata (Chamberlin, 1925) – Cuba
H. unca Brady, 1964 – Southern Texas
H. ursa Brady, 1970 – Panama
H. vanbruggeni Deeleman-Reinhold, 2009 – Borneo

See also
 List of Oxyopidae species

References

Araneomorphae genera
Cosmopolitan spiders
Oxyopidae
Taxa named by Eugen von Keyserling